Warren White is a professor emeritus, and a former Research Oceanographer at the Marine Biological Research Division at Scripps Institution of Oceanography at UC San Diego.

White, with 'Buzz' Bernstein, was instrumental in the development and operation of the TRANSPAC XBT Volunteer Observing Ship program. Between 1976 and 1984, commercial ships crossing the Pacific Ocean recorded expendable bathythermograph (XBT) data. This data became instrumental in a number of studies, particularly around the Kuroshio Current. As well as its direct oceanographic value, this data was also important for determining the scale of features of interest, thus influencing the design of later observational networks.

His research interests included:
 Planetary wave dynamics
 Interdecadal oscillations and their relation to El Niño and La Niña
 Global climate change
 Coupled ocean-atmosphere interaction

He is known for his work on the Antarctic Circumpolar Wave.

Publications

References

External links 

American climatologists
American oceanographers
Scripps Institution of Oceanography faculty
Living people
Year of birth missing (living people)